Ahmad Pejman (born 1935), also spelled as Ahmad Pezhman, is an Iranian classical composer who resides in the United States.  Pejman is notable for his operatic and symphonic works.

Biography
Born in 1935 in Lar, Iran, Pejman was exposed to the sounds and rhythms of southern Iran from early childhood.  In high school he started violin lessons with Heshmat Sanjari and music theory with Hossein Nassehi.

As a young violinist with the Tehran Symphony Orchestra, he was awarded a scholarship to study composition at the Music Academy in Vienna.  He studied composition with Thomas Christian David, Alfred Uhl, and Hans Jelineck, Friedrich Cerha As a first year student at the Academy, Pejman's compositions were performed by the Vienna Chamber Orchestra and his orchestral work Rhapsody was performed by the Vienna Radio Symphony Orchestra. In his third year as a student, he was commissioned to write the first Persian Opera Rustic Festival for the opening of the Tehran Opera house, Rudaki Hall. Upon graduation from the Academy of Music in Vienna, Pejman returned to Iran in 1968, where he was commissioned to write the opera Hero of Sahand (Delāvar-e-Sahand) which was based on legendary Persian hero Babak Khorramdin.  The opera was premiered at Roudaki Hall in 1968.  Between 1969 and 1978, Pejman continued to compose symphonic works, operas, ballets, and also wrote many scores for motion pictures and television programs.

In 1976, three years before the Iranian revolution, Pejman moved to New York, where he entered Columbia University's Doctorate of Music program in New York and continued his studies with Buelant Arel, Vladimir Ussachevsky and Jack Beeson.

In 1984, Pejman moved to Los Angeles and continued to compose and arrange music for jazz and pop ensembles, and motion pictures Threat, 1985.

In 1992, Pejman was commissioned to write a cantata for choir and orchestra for the liberation of Khorramshahr Beh Yade Khorramshahr, 1992. He was then commissioned to write music for a musical theater to be performed at Vahdat Hall (previously called Rudaki) Mokhtar, 1993. Since 1993 Pejman has been writing film music and composing for the orchestra and choir and released various soundtracks and CDs.

Compositions 

Pejman has written orchestral works, operas, film scores, ballet pieces, and popular music.

 Concerto for nine instruments 1964 (Student at Music Academy in Vienna)
 Rhapsody for orchestra 1965 (Student at Music Academy in Vienna)
 Sonata for viola and piano (1966) (Student at Music Academy in Vienna)
 Parsian Overture (1966) (Student at Music Academy in Vienna)
 Rustic Festival, Opera in one act for the opening of Rudaki Opera house,1967
 The Hero of Sahand, Opera in 2 acts, 1968
 The Illumination, Ballet, 1969
 Samandar, Opera in three acts, 1970
 Baba Barfi, Children Music, 1971
 Gol Omad, Bahar Omad, Children Music, 1971
 Music for Poems of Nima Youshij, recited by Ahmad Shamlou, 1972
 Chamber Music for Santoor and Tombak, 1972
 Ballet-Impressions, 1973
 Ayyaran, Ballet for Persian Instruments, 1974
 Symphonic Sketches, 1975
 Hemmaseh, Ballet (performed by Manchester Ballet Company 1976
 3 Pieces for Jazz Ensemble 1980
 Music Arrangement and Pop compositions 1988-1991
 Khorramshahr, Cantata for soloist, chorus and orchestra 1992
 Mokhtar, Musical Theater 1993
 Seven Hurdles of Rostam, Ballet 1996
 Resurrection, Oratorio Mosfilm Orchestra Moscow Academy Choir 2007
 Sohrab, Music for Soloist, Choir and Orchestra (on Sohrab Sepehri poems 2009
 Shadows of the Sun 2010 (to be released on Hermes Records 2010)
 Norooz Symphony in 5 movements 2011
 Divertimento in 4 movements for String Orchestra 2016
 Parsava - 5 movements for solo piano 2016
 Sarzamin Delavaran (Land of the Brave) 2017

Film and Television 

 Sadeh Celebration, Film Music Askari-Nasab director, 1971
 Daliran Tengestan TV series, Homayoon Shahnavaz director 1973
 Shazdeh Ehtejab Film Music, Bahman Farmanara, director, 1974
 Tall Shadows of the Wind Film Music, Bahman Farmanara director 1977
 Made in Iran aka Sakhte Iran Film Music, Amir Naderi director, 1978
 Crossroads of Civilization TV series, David Frost producer 1978-1979
 Veiled Threat Film Music, Cyrus Nowrasteh director, 1986
 Checkpoint Film Music Parviz Sayyad Director, 1987
 The Actor, Film Music Mohsen Makhmalbaf director, 1993
 Zinat Film Music Ebrahim Mokhtari director, 1993
 Kimia Film Music Mohammad Reza Darvish director, 1995
 The Blue Veiled Film Music, Rakhshan Bani Etemad director 1995
 Iranair documentary - Film Music Mostafa R. Karimi 1997
 Friendly Persuasion Film Music Jamsheed Akrami director 1999
 Smell of Camphor, Fragrance of Jasmine Film Music, Bahman Farmanara 2000
 Baran Film Music Majid Majidi director 2001
 Along the Wind Documentary film music Manouchehr Tayyab director 2001
 A House Built on Water Film Music Bahman Farmanara director 2002
 Astan Ghods Razavi Documentary Film Music Manouchehr Tayyab director 2003
 A Little Kiss Film Music Bahman Farmanara Director, 2005
 The Willow Tree Film Music Majid Majidi Director 2005
 Sea of Pars Documentary Film Music Manouchehr Tayyab director, 2006
 Alborz Documentary Film Music Manouchehr Tayyab director, 2011

Recordings 
 Hameh Shahre Iran (Ethnic Music of Iran) - Naydavood Records
 Jing-o-jing-e saaz - Alladin Records
 Eternal River - Alladin Records
 Symphonic Sketches - Alladin Records
 Tigress - Alladin Records
 Memories of Tomorrow - Hermes Records
 Mirage - Hermes Records
 Lunatic - Hermes Records
 Haft Khan Rostam - MZM Records

Tribute 

"Resurrection concert" or "A Persian Night with Vancouver Opera Orchestra featuring Vancouver Bach Choir was held at Orpheum theatre in Vancouver on January 20, 2019 to pay tribute to Ahmad Pejman. The creator director and producer of the concert was Mohammad Fazlali. For the very first time in Canada, 150 Professional musicians graced the magnificent Orpheum Theatre to perform masterpieces by renowned Iranian composers on the Persian Night concert. Three movemnts of Symphonic Poem "Sudden Resurrection" composed by Ahmad Pejman were performed in this concert, conducted by Leslie Dala. This concert was World live premier of "Sudden Resurrection". Ahmad Pejman was present in the concert. Pieces from other Iranian composers; Loris Tjeknavorian, Hooshang Kamkar, Homayoun Khorram, Gholamhossein Minbashian, 
Fardin Khalatbari, Mahyar Alizadeh, Ramin Jamalpour, 
Saman Samimi were in the repertoire of the concert as well. 
Alireza Ghorbani and Talin Ohanian were Vocalists in this concert.

References

External links 
 [ Ahmad Pejman] at Allmusic
 
 http://www.iranian.com/Music/Pejman/index.html

1937 births
Iranian classical composers
Iranian classical violinists
Iranian emigrants to the United States
Iranian film score composers
Living people
21st-century classical violinists
Columbia University School of the Arts alumni
University of Music and Performing Arts Vienna alumni